Boomerang: Coast to Coaster is a steel roller coaster of shuttle design currently in use at four different Six Flags & EPR theme parks. The ride was designed and manufactured by Vekoma, and is considered as one of its boomerang models. Each coaster has one train with a capacity of 28, two across in each row. Unlike Vekoma's suspended trains, "Boomerang: Coast to Coaster" operates a sit-down design. When the coaster starts, the train is pulled backwards up the lift hill, then dropped through the loading gate through a cobra roll and then one loop. At the end of this cycle the train is pulled up the lift hill at the end of the track, then dropped once again allowing the train to go back through the loops backwards, hence the name "Boomerang: Coast to Coaster."

Design and operation
Originally, the coasters had a teal track & white supports. As of 2015, Six Flags Darien Lake's model still has its original colors; Six Flags Discovery Kingdom's model has teal track and yellow supports; Elitch Gardens' model has a yellow track and purple supports; and Six Flags Fiesta Texas' has teal track and orange supports.

This is the standard Vekoma Boomerang roller coaster design found at forty-three different amusement parks worldwide. It is currently operating at Six Flags Darien Lake, Six Flags Discovery Kingdom, Elitch Gardens and Six Flags Fiesta Texas (Six Flags). It also operates at Great Escape and Six Flags New England under the name Flashback.

List of ride locations

In 2016 Six Flags Great Escape renamed their Boomerang from Boomerang: Coast To Coaster to Flashback like the version at sister park Six Flags New England.

Gallery

See also
 Invertigo (roller coaster)

External links
 Vekoma web site
 Boomerang: Coast to Coaster listing at RCDB.com

Roller coasters operated by Six Flags
Steel roller coasters
Roller coasters manufactured by Vekoma
Roller coasters in California
Roller coasters in Colorado
Roller coasters in New York (state)
Roller coasters in Texas
Roller coasters introduced in 1997
Roller coasters introduced in 1998
Roller coasters introduced in 1999
Boomerang roller coasters
Six Flags Darien Lake
Elitch Gardens Theme Park
Six Flags Discovery Kingdom
Six Flags Fiesta Texas
The Great Escape and Hurricane Harbor
Roller coasters operated by Herschend Family Entertainment